Michael Zenezini (30 September 1980) is a French ice dancer. With Melanie Espejo, he placed fifth at the 1998 World Junior Championships. In 2011, he performed on Dancing on Ice with Chloe Madeley.

Skating career

Competitive 
Zenezini grew up in Lyon and began skating at the age of eight. He competed in ice dancing and won the French junior title with Melanie Espejo. They were assigned to the 1997 World Junior Championships in Seoul, South Korea and finished ninth. The following season, they placed fifth at the 1998 World Junior Championships in Saint John, New Brunswick, Canada. Zenezini also competed briefly with Nathalie Péchalat and Véronique Delobel. He retired from competition in 2002.

Ice shows 
Zenezini later appeared in ice shows. He spent six years with Holiday on Ice and then skated in Hot Ice. His partners included Lindsey Woolstencroft, Carole Azario, and Suzanna Dagger.

In 2011, Zenezini joined series six of the U.K. television programme Dancing on Ice as Chloe Madeley's partner.

Personal life 
Zenezini lives near Cannes with his wife, Barbara Maros, a Hungarian skater.

References 

1980 births
Living people
French male ice dancers
Sportspeople from Lyon